Eduard Neumann may refer to:

 Eduard Neumann (philologist) (1903–1985), German philologist
 Eduard Neumann (fighter pilot) (1911-2004), German fighter pilot